Australocarcinus is a genus of crabs, of the family Chasmocarcinidae. It includes 4 species.

Species
Australocarcinus insperatus Ng & Daniels, 2018
Australocarcinus kanaka Davie & Guinot, 1996
Australocarcinus palauensis Davie & Guinot, 1996
Australocarcinus riparius Davie, 1988

References

External links
Two new freshwater crabs in Australocarcinus Davie, with remarks on Trogloplacinae Guinot and Goneplacidae Macleay
Ultrastructure of the spermatozoon of Australocarcinus riparius
Identification and Ecology of Australian Freshwater Crabs

Goneplacoidea
Crustaceans of the Atlantic Ocean